Lumican, also known as LUM, is an extracellular matrix protein that, in humans, is encoded by the  LUM gene on chromosome 12.

Structure 

Lumican is a proteoglycan Class II member of the small leucine-rich proteoglycan (SLRP) family that includes decorin, biglycan, fibromodulin, keratocan, epiphycan, and osteoglycin. 
 
Like the other SLRPs, lumican has a molecular weight of about 40 kiloDaltons and has four major intramolecular domains: 
a signal peptide of 16 amino acid residues;
a negatively-charged N-terminal domain containing sulfated tyrosine and disulfide bond(s);
ten tandem leucine-rich repeats allowing lumican to bind to other extracellular components such as collagen;
a carboxyl terminal domain of 50 amino acid residues containing two conserved cysteines 32 residues apart.

There are four N-linked sites within the leucine-rich repeat domain of the protein core that can be substituted with keratan sulfate. The core protein of lumican (like decorin and fibromodulin) is horseshoe shaped. This enables it bind to collagen molecules within a collagen fibril, thus helping keep adjacent fibrils apart.

Function 

Lumican is a major keratan sulfate proteoglycan of the cornea but is ubiquitously distributed in most mesenchymal tissues throughout the body. Lumican is involved in collagen fibril organization and circumferential growth, corneal transparency, and epithelial cell migration and tissue repair. Corneal transparency is possible due to the exact alignment of collagen fibers by lumican (and keratocan) in the intrafibrillar space.

Clinical significance 

Mice that have the lumican gene knocked out (Lum-/-) develop opacities of the cornea in both eyes and fragile skin. The lumican (LUM) gene was thought to be a candidate susceptibility gene for high myopia; however, a meta-analysis showed no association between LUM polymorphism and high myopia susceptibility in all genetic models studied.

Lum knockout mice also have abnormal collagen in their heart tissue, with fewer and thicker fibrils. Mice deficient in both lumican and fibromodulin develop severe tendinopathy (tendon pathology), revealing the importance of these SLRPs in the development of correctly sized and aligned collagen fibers in tendon. Along with other extracellular matrix components, lumican expression was increased in equine flexor tendons six weeks after an injury.

Lumican is present in the extracellular matrix of uteral tissues in fertile women. There is an increase of lumican during the proliferative to secretory phase of the endometrium. In menopausal endometrial tissue, the level of lumican expression decreases and is also low in pathological compared to normal endometrium.

Lumican is highly expressed in pleural effusions (lung fluid) of patients with adenocarcinoma. Its expression was low in cancer cells but high in the extracellular matrix surrounding the tumor. Lumican expression was not associated with tumor grade or stage. In about half the patients with pancreatic ductal adenocarcinoma tested, lumican in the extracellular matrix around the tumor was associated with a reduction in metastatic recurrence after surgery and with a three-fold longer survival than patients without stromal lumican. As lumican can directly bind to and inhibit matrix metalloproteinase-14 (MMP14), lumican may limit tumor progression by preventing extracellular matrix collagen proteolysis by this enzyme.

References

Further reading 

 
 
 
 
 
 
 
 
 
 
 
 
 
 
 
 
 
 
 

Proteins